Vijay Jhappan (born 30 March 1975) is a former British Virgin Islands cricketer. Jhappan was a right-handed batsman who bowled right-arm medium pace.

In 2006, the British Virgin Islands were invited to take part in the 2006 Stanford 20/20, whose matches held official Twenty20 status. Jhappan made a single appearance in the tournament against Saint Lucia in a preliminary round defeat, with Jhappan being run out for a duck by Mervin Charles.

References

Vijay's son Ajay Jhappan. Upcoming cricketer who bowls medium pace.

http://216.15.201.239/bowling-stats

External links
Vijay Jhappan at ESPNcricinfo
Vijay Jhappan at CricketArchive

1975 births
Living people
British Virgin Islands cricketers